Grange Park Methodist Church, also known as The Church in the Orchard, is an architecturally notable church in the Art Deco style in Park Drive, Grange Park, in the London Borough of Enfield. It was designed by Charles H. Brightiff and opened in 1938.

References

External links 

https://www.grangeparkmethodistchurch.com/

Churches completed in 1938
Churches in the London Borough of Enfield
Methodist churches in London
Art Deco architecture in London